The 2016–17 film awards season began in November 2016 with the Gotham Independent Film Awards 2016 and ended in February 2017 with the 89th Academy Awards. Major winners for the year included La La Land, Moonlight, Manchester by the Sea, among others.

Award ceremonies

References 

2016 film awards
2017 film awards
American film awards